

Magarey is a locality in the Australian state of South Australia located in the state’s south-east about  south-east of the state capital of Adelaide and about  west of the municipal seat in Millicent.

Magarey’s boundaries were created on 18 December 1997.  It was originally proposed to be named as Woakwine, but objections from local residents resulted in Margarey being approved as the  locality’s name.

Land use within Magarey is zoned for primary production.

The 2016 Australian census which was conducted in August 2016 reports that Magarey had a population of 12 people.

Magarey is located within the federal division of Barker, the state electoral district of MacKillop and the local government area of the Wattle Range Council.

References

 

Towns in South Australia
Limestone Coast